We See the Same Sun is the second album by German eurodance group Mr. President, released in May 1996.

This album arranged the band's international breakthrough, including three hit singles: "Coco Jamboo", their most successful song that entered the charts all over Europe, Australia and the United States, "I Give You My Heart" and "Show Me the Way". The album also contains a song recorded with German singer Nino De Angelo, "Olympic Dreams".

In the year of its release the band won a Viva Comet for Best Dance Act and 12 months later they received an Echo award for their international success with We See the Same Sun, being the best selling German artist outside Germany.

Critical reception
British magazine Music Week viewed We See the Same Sun as a "sunny, sparky debut album".

Track listing

Charts

Weekly charts

Year-end charts

Sales and certifications

References

1996 albums
Mr. President (band) albums